First Light's Freeze is an album by Castanets, released on October 11, 2005. Ray Raposa described the recording of the album as 'on some the interludes between tracks we had like seven people on them so that is half of the credits right there. But most of the tracks are Rafter [Roberts], Sufjan [Stevens] and I doing lots of overdubs'. The album features contributions by Chris Schlarb and Daniel Carter.

Critical acclaim 
Brian Howe from pitchforkmedia.com described the album as ' stringing together disembodied fragments of gothic Americana with brief, freaky interludes', while Heather Pares finds the themes of 'war and friendship' expressed through 'sparkling nighttime laments'. David Bernard in popmatters.com found the album 'consistently captivating' while 'many tracks hum with electronics and crawl along at a codeine pace'. Grigsby of tinymixtapes.com praised Raposa's writing as '[his] strength might lie in melancholy pop songs, and at that, he might be peerless'. Matthew Ozga of prefixmag was less impressed calling the album 'a real snooze musically' while characterising Raposa as a 'relentless obscurantist'. In December 2005, American webzine Somewhere Cold ranked First Light's Freeze No. 7 on their 2005 Somewhere Cold Awards Hall of Fame list.

Track listing

Personnel 
As with the previous release Cathedral, contributors as simply listed as 'performers' without indicating their specific role.
 Bridgit DeCook 
 Chris Schlarb
 Daniel Carter
 G. Lucas Crane
 Gabriel Sundy
 Heidi Diehl
 Justice Constantine
 Nathan Delffs
 Nathan Hubbard
 Orlando Greenhill 
 Rafter Roberts
 Raymond Raposa
 Sayard Egan
 Jarvis Taveniere
 Sufjan Stevens
The album was mixed and mastered by Ero Thomson and Rafter Roberts.

References

2005 albums
Castanets (band) albums
Asthmatic Kitty albums
Psychedelic folk albums